Théo Colette (born 6 November 1927) was a Belgian footballer. He played in two matches for the Belgium national football team in 1957.

References

External links
 

1927 births
Possibly living people
Belgian footballers
Belgium international footballers
Place of birth missing (living people)
Association football goalkeepers